Pascal Landais (born 13 June 1979) is a retired French football goalkeeper who last played for Chamois Niortais. He started his career with Niort, before leaving to join Vannes OC in 2003. Following a five-year spell with Thouars Foot 79, Landais re-signed for Niort on a free transfer on 15 June 2009.

Landais made eight appearances in Ligue 2 with Niort between 1998 and 2003.

References

1979 births
French footballers
Living people
Association football goalkeepers
Chamois Niortais F.C. players
Vannes OC players
Thouars Foot 79 players